Bjørn Andreas Paulson (21 June 1923 – 14 January 2008) was a Norwegian high jumper and jurist.

He was a grandson of Andreas Paulson. He was born in Bergen, but represented the club IL Skjalg. At the 1948 Summer Olympics held in London he finished second in the high jump final with a jump of 1.95 metres. He became Norwegian champion in 1948. His personal best jump was 1.96 metres, achieved at the Norwegian championships in August 1948 in Trondheim.

A cand.jur. by education, Paulson became a police superintendent in 1953. From 1967 to 1993 he worked as a public prosecutor. He died in 2008.

References

1923 births
2008 deaths
Norwegian male high jumpers
Athletes (track and field) at the 1948 Summer Olympics
Olympic athletes of Norway
Norwegian jurists
Sportspeople from Bergen
Medalists at the 1948 Summer Olympics
Olympic silver medalists for Norway
Olympic silver medalists in athletics (track and field)